Matty Ashton (born 28 July 1998) is a professional rugby league footballer who plays as a  for the Warrington Wolves in the Betfred Super League.

He previously played for the Swinton Lions in the Betfred Championship.

Playing career

Swinton Lions
Ashton signed for Swinton from Rochdale Mayfield ARLFC.

Warrington Wolves
On 19 August 2019 it was announced that Ashton had signed for Warrington. 

In 2020 he made his Super League début for the Wolves against the Wigan Warriors.

References

External links
Warrington Wolves profile

1998 births
Living people
England Knights national rugby league team players
Rugby league fullbacks
Swinton Lions players
Warrington Wolves players